S.T.R.E.E.T. D.A.D. is the debut album by American electronic dance rock band Out Hud.

Composition
S.T.R.E.E.T. D.A.D. has been musically aligned with post-rock, with applause given to its uniquely "danceable" take on the genre. Tiny Mix Tapes saw the group "ably" work in an '80s new wave aesthetic, recalling bands like ABC, Duran Duran, and A Flock of Seagulls. Other styles seen include electro, indie rock, and neo-disco. Spin dubbed it "a synth-pop idyll".

Critical reception and legacy
Calling it "equally cerebral and hip-shaking", AllMusic's Andy Kellman applauded S.T.R.E.E.T. D.A.D. as "an incredibly creative fusion of several styles of music that ends up sounding like no one else in particular". Pitchforks Eric Carr praised the album's "remarkable substance" through "darkly evocative compositions…filled with unspoken imagery and emotion." It was awarded the site's Best New Music accolade.

More than ten years after its release, Stereogums Sam Hockley-Smith revisited D.A.D. in the site's Backtrack column. He dubbed it "an ominous, funny and often very deep" album, claiming that it spoke to "the uncertain times we perpetually inhabit". In 2021, Pitchfork credited the album with spreading dance-punk music alongside works by other bands like !!! and Liars.

Accolades

Track listing

Personnel
Sourced from AllMusic.

Out Hud
 Nic Offer - acoustic guitar, bass guitar, keyboards
 Molly Schnick - cello, keyboards, violin
 Tyler Pope - bass guitar, drum programming, guitar
 Phyllis Forbes - drums, guitar, bass guitar
 Justin Van Der Volgen - mixing

References

2002 debut albums
Kranky albums
Out Hud albums